The pedestrian bridge  pedestrian bridge over the Desna river in the city of Chernigov, Ukraine.

History
One of the powers of the Chernihiv bridges. It is the only pedestrian bridge across the Desna in the city of Chernigov. Administratively it is located within the city of Chernigov, connects the banks of the Desna, is located next to the Chernigov river port. It has special barriers that prevent vehicles from passing through. It was built in 1987 by the NP Melnikov Central Research and Design Institute of Building Metal Structures. In 2014, it was painted yellow and blue by activists. On the bridge you can use the services of bungee jumping, also known as a cult place for lovers, on special metal structures in the form of hanging padlocks. On 23 March 2022, due to the Siege of Chernihiv by the 2022 Russian invasion of Ukraine the Road bridge Across the Desna was destroyed and since that, for 2 weeks, the only option to leave the city was a pedestrian bridge across the Desna. This way people left Chernihiv on foot to get to Anisov and Kulykivka through the fields. Cars with the most necessary things for the defenders of Chernihiv were allowed here separately. By the way the Pedestrian Bridge was a little bit damaged by operative,"In view of this, a joint decision was made with the Chernihiv Regional State Administration to limit traffic on this bridge as much as possible. Traffic is prohibited, only pedestrian crossing," the North North said in a statement.

Gallery

References

External links
 wikimapia.org

Bridges in Chernihiv